Koloveč is a market town in Domažlice District in the Plzeň Region of the Czech Republic. It has about 1,000 inhabitants.

Administrative parts
The village of Zichov is an administrative part of Koloveč.

References

Populated places in Domažlice District
Market towns in the Czech Republic